The Anthropological Museum of Petralona is thirty-five kilometres from Thessaloniki, in Central Macedonia, Greece. It displays finds from the nearby Petralona cave, in which the oldest European hominid skull was found.

The village of Petralona, Chalkidiki is on the old Thessaloniki–Nea Moudania national highway. The cave and the anthropological museum are a further 2 km beyond the village. The museum was built and financed in 1978 by the Anthropological Society of Greece (AEE), which owns it. It opened in 1979. The purpose of the museum is to showcase the finds from the Petralona cave, the prehistoric culture of Greece, and finds representing the entire palaeoanthropological area of Greece.

The finds include replicas of the mausoleum of Archanthropus europeus petralonsiensis, the oldest traces of fire ever found (from the 24th geological stratum in the Petralona cave, which is more than one million years old), the earliest stone and bone tools, which were found at Nea Triglia in Chalkidiki (11 million years old), and finds from open spaces before the cave-dwelling era in Nea Triglia, the island of Euboea, Ptolemaida, the Aegean, other parts of Greece, and Africa.

There are also murals by the folk painter Christos Kagaras illustrating the emergence of life on Earth and Archanthropus teaching his children how to make tools of stone and bone, the evolution of life according to Aristotle, and the evolution of human life over the last 11 million years according to Poulianos.

The museum has a conference room, geological and palaeoanthropological conservation workshops, and a library.

Gallery

Attribution

External links
* Page at site of the Anthropological Society of Greece

Buildings and structures in Thessaloniki (regional unit)
Petralona
Museums in Central Macedonia
Museums established in 1978